The 2022 Overwatch League season was the fifth season of the Overwatch League (OWL), a professional esports league. Contrasted to the first four seasons, which was played on the video game Overwatch, the season was played on an early build of Overwatch 2. The regular season began on May 5, 2022 and ended on October 22. The playoffs were played at the Anaheim Convention Center in Anaheim, California, beginning on October 30, and concluded with the Grand Finals on November 4. The Dallas Fuel won the Grand Finals over the San Francisco Shock to win their first OWL championship.

League format and changes

Rosters and salaries 
The 2022 season was being played on an early build of Blizzard upcoming title Overwatch 2. As such, matches were played with teams of five, rather than teams of six. The minimum number of players on a team was decreased from seven to six, while the maximum number of players remains at twelve. Teams could players to a minimum of one season and could add an option to extend that contract for an additional year, if they so chose. Teams were also allowed to sign players to short-term 30-day contracts and two-way contracts.

Regions and live events 
As with the prior two seasons, the twenty teams were divided into two regions, the East and West. Seven teams from China and South Korea competed in the East Region, while thirteen teams from North America and Europe competed in the West Division. While the majority of matches in the 2020 and 2021 seasons were played online, live events returned for the 2022 season.

Broadcasting 

The League hired Toronto-based production provider Dome Productions to produce and broadcast the 2022 season. The decision to hire a third-party operator left World of Warcraft as Activision Blizzard's only supported esports title that had not been outsourced by March 2022.

In January 2022, shoutcasters Brennon "Bren" Hook and Josh "Sideshow" Wilkinson, who had been with the broadcast team since the league's inaugural season, announced that they did "not have an agreement for 2022 with Overwatch League, marking the end of [their] four years as broadcast talent." In an interview with Dot Esports, the duo noted that the time limit in which negotiations had to take place, as well as the monetary value of the deals, were the main reason for their departure. However, they clarified that they would still be involved with the league via co-streams. The league announced their talent lineup on April 11, 2022, which included neither Hook nor Wilkinson.

On April 20, 2022, the OWL announced that they would be launching a co-streaming initiative, in which select streamers would be able to stream OWL broadcasts simultaneously with their own. It will be the first time that the league has allowed co-streaming, and co-streams are restricted to only be broadcast on YouTube.

Regular season 
The regular season began on May 5, 2022. Teams played a total 24 regular season matches, which acted as qualifiers for four standalone tournaments, the Kickoff Clash, Midseason Madness, Summer Showdown and Countdown Cup, which took take place in that order. Each tournament was preceded by six regional qualifying matches. In 2021, all four tournament cycles culminated in an interregional tournament; however, for the 2022 season, the Kickoff Clash and Summer Showdown were regional tournaments, with eight teams qualifying from the West and four teams qualifying in the East, while the Midseason Madness were interregional. The final tournament cycle of the season, the Countdown Cup, did conclude with a tournament.

Similar to the 2021 season, the league used a point system, called League Points, to determine regular season standings. Every win in the regular season earned a team one point. Any team that qualifies for a regional tournament received an additional one point; a first- or second-place finish in a regional midseason tournament instead earned the placing team an additional three or two points, respectively. Any team that qualified for the Midseason Madness tournament received an additional one point; a first-, second-, or third- place finish in the Midseason Madness tournament instead earned the placing team an additional four, three, or two points, respectively.

East region

West region

Kickoff Clash 
The Kickoff Clash is the first of four midseason tournament cycles of the season. Qualifiers began on May 5 in the West region, while the East region qualifiers were delayed until May 20 due to increasing COVID-19 concerns in China. Teams that advance past the qualifiers will play in their respective regional tournaments, which will take place from June 2 to 5. The West region tournament will take place live at Esports Stadium Arlington.

Qualifiers 

East region

West region

Tournaments 

East region

West region

Midseason Madness 
The Midseason Madness is the second of four midseason tournament cycles of the season. Qualifiers began on June 16 in the West region and June 24 in the East region. Qualification for the Midseason Madness is based on league points earned through the entire first half the season. Teams that advance past the qualifiers will play an interregional tournament. Like in the previous season, the top Western teams will travel to Hawaii for the interregional tournament to minimize latency, while the top Eastern teams will stay in their home facilities. The 12-team, double-elimination tournament began on July 18 and will conclude with the finals on July 23.

Qualifiers 

East region

West region

Tournament

Summer Showdown 
The Summer Showdown was the third midseason tournament cycle of the season.

Qualifiers 

East region

West region

Tournaments 

East region

West region

Postseason

Play-in tournaments 
The play-in tournaments was two regional tournaments that took place following the Countdown Cup tournament cycle. The Eastern region play-in tournament saw seeds four through six play in a single-elimination tournament on October 15, with the winner advancing to the season playoffs. In the Western region, seeds seven through ten played in a double-elimination tournament from October 21 to 22, with the top two teams advancing to the season playoffs. All matches were determined by which team wins three maps.

Brackets 

East region

West region

Playoffs 

A total of twelve teams advanced to the season playoffs. The top six teams from the West and the top three teams from the East, based on the regular season standings, advanced directly to the season playoffs. The play-ins qualified an additional one team from the East and two teams from the West. The entirety of the season playoffs took place at the Anaheim Convention Center in Anaheim, California, beginning on October 31, and concluded with the Grand Finals on November 4.

Bracket

Awards

Individual awards

Role Stars

Source:

Prize pool 
Teams in the 2022 season competed for a prize pool across midseason tournaments and playoffs, with the payout division detailed below.

References

External links 
 

 
Overwatch